Dennis is a census-designated place and unincorporated community located at the intersection of Mississippi Highway 25 and Mississippi Highway 4 in Tishomingo County, Mississippi, United States.

Although an unincorporated community, Dennis had a post office. Although it was shutdown some years ago.

It was first named as a CDP in the 2020 Census which listed a population of 172.

Demographics

2020 census

Note: the US Census treats Hispanic/Latino as an ethnic category. This table excludes Latinos from the racial categories and assigns them to a separate category. Hispanics/Latinos can be of any race.

References

Unincorporated communities in Tishomingo County, Mississippi
Unincorporated communities in Mississippi
Census-designated places in Tishomingo County, Mississippi